DIGI (Teraoka/DIGI Group) is a global corporation with offices in Japan, Europe and North America. Founded in 1925, it supplies weighing and packaging equipment for trade, industries, and logistics. Its products are widely used in the manufacturing, retail, and consumer fields. The company occupies 30% of the Russian market of weighing scales.

Although the company dates back to 1925, its activity dates back to 1910, when industrialist Teraoka Toyonaru created the Japan Calculation Machinery Manufacturing Co, which was focused on innovative technologies and supporting inventions. It produced precision instruments for industries and consumers. At the time of its inception, Teraoka had already developed weight scales capable of functioning under different temperature environments, which had been patented in Japan, the United States, the United Kingdom, Germany and France. Establishing itself firmly in its market,  Teraoka Takeharu, son of Toyonaru, started the Teraoka Research Center (Teraoka Seiko Co., Ltd.), which would eventually form part of Teraoka/DIGI Group. The corporation presently operates five R&D centres and five production sites across Europe and Asia, as well as its own line of strain gauges.

Official Website: https://www.digisystem.com/

Components of the Teraoka/DIGI Group 
 Teraoka Seiko Co., Ltd. — global headquarters (Japan)
 DIGI I's Ltd. — production (Japan)
 Digi Singapore Pte. Ltd. — production (Singapore)
 DIGI Europe Ltd. — regional headquarters (United Kingdom)
 Shanghai Teraoka Electronic Co., Ltd. — sales and marketing (China)
 DIGI Software (Philippines) Inc. — software division (Philippines)
 DIGI Canada Inc. — North American headquarters
 DIGI Deutschland GmbH. — Germany division
 DIGI France S.A. — France division
 DIGI Nederland B.V. — Netherlands division
 DIGI BELGIUM — Belgium division
 DIGI Italia S.r.l. - Italy division
 DIGI TURKEY Elektronik San. ve Tic. Ltd. -Turkey division 
 DIGI KOREA WEIGH SYSTEM CO., LTD. — South Korea division
 DIGI SYSTEM GURGAON PVT LTD. — India division
 Essae-Teraoka Ltd. — India division

Further reading 
 Вестник Санкт-Петербургского ун-та "Серия Менеджмент" 2011. Вып. 2 - "Отечественный рынок торговых электронных весов"
 Журнал "Торговое оборудование в России" - "На чаше весов", Июль, 2010 
 Журнал "Торговое оборудование в России" - "Весы для торговли и склада", Февраль, 2008 
 Журнал "Торговое оборудование в России" - "Мультимедийная реклама - игрушка или технология будущего?", Январь, 2005 
 Журнал "Торговое оборудование в России" - "Взвешивайте ваши товары, взвешивайте ваши решения", Июнь, 2004 
 Журнал "Торговое оборудование в России" - "Надо все как следует взвесить", Май, 2004

See also 
 CAS Corporation
 Mettler Toledo
 Bizerba

References

External links 
 DIGI Global website
 DIGI Global LinkedIn

Manufacturing companies established in 1925
Technology companies established in 1925
Weighing scale manufacturers
Packaging companies of Japan
Japanese companies established in 1925
Manufacturing companies based in Tokyo
Japanese brands